is a leading House of Lords case on privity of contract. It was a test case in which it was sought to establish a basis upon which stevedores could claim the protection of exceptions and limitations contained in a bill of lading contract to which they were not party. The Court outlined an exception to the privity rule, known as the Lord Reid test, through agency as it applies to sub-contractors and employees seeking protection in their employers' contract.

Facts
Scruttons Ltd was shipping a load of crates through a carrier. In the contract between the two parties there was a limitation of liability clause for $500 (£179) per box. The goods were damaged in transit due to the negligence of the stevedores. The stevedores were under contract with the shipping company which contained an exclusion clause. 
Midland were unaware of the relationship between the carriers and the stevedores.

Judgment
At first blush, it was clear to the Court that the stevedores could not be exempted by the exemption clause as there was no privity of contract. The Court looked at whether there was a bailment relationship but found none. The case turned on the application of the Elder, Dempster case which suggested that privity could be circumvented. Lord Reid proposed that the stevedores could be covered under the contractual clause through agency if certain pre-conditions were satisfied.

All of Lord Reid's preconditions were satisfied in the subsequent case of New Zealand Shipping v Satterthwaite (The Eurymedon) [1975] AC 154.

The Scruttons case followed an earlier case with similar reasoning, Adler v Dickson (The Himalaya).

Significance

With the Scruttons case, the issue of third party rights in a contract were made certain. There had been much speculation on the meaning of Elder, Dempster but it became clear that there was no new rule from that case. This case, among others, resulted in the change of practice in shipping contracts by adding Himalaya clauses to protect third parties.

See also
Privity
Privity in English law
Third party beneficiary

External links
 Full text of House of Lords decision from BAILII.org

References

House of Lords cases
English contract case law
English privity case law
1961 in British law
1961 in case law